Senator Kendall may refer to:

Jonas Kendall (1757–1844), Massachusetts State Senate
Joseph G. Kendall (1788–1847), Massachusetts State Senate